Jill Remez is an American actress known for her acting work in several films and television programs as well as her skill at puppetry, having been one of the puppeteers behind Miss Piggy for The Jim Henson Company. She portrayed Juanita Vasquez on the television soap opera Passions.

References

External links
 
 
 

20th-century American actresses
21st-century American actresses
Year of birth missing (living people)
Living people
American film actresses
American television actresses
Actresses from Los Angeles
University of California, Irvine alumni